Shoot me may refer to:
 Just Shoot Me!, an American television sitcom that aired from 1997 to 2003
 Elaine Stritch: Shoot Me, a 2013 documentary film
 Shoot Me: Youth Part 1, the third extended play by South Korean band DAY6.